Şeref Stadium was a football stadium in Beşiktaş, İstanbul. It was named after Beşiktaş's former president Şeref Bey.

External links
http://www.angelfire.com/nj/sivritepe/5758/artlIST.html

Sports venues in Istanbul
Defunct association football venues in Turkey
Buildings and structures completed in 1933
Sports venues demolished in 1987
1987 disestablishments in Turkey
Beşiktaş J.K. facilities
Sport in Beşiktaş